Mbongo is the common ancestor of the Sawa peoples of Cameroon according to their oral traditions.

Mbongo may also refer to:

People
Mbedi a Mbongo, son of Mbongo
Guy M'Bongo (born 1968), basketball player from the Central African Republic
Paul Mbongo (born 1971), Cameroonian boxer

Places
Mbongo, Angola, a town in southwest Africa
Mobayi-Mbongo, formerly known as Banzyville or Banzystad, a town in the Democratic Republic of the Congo

Other uses
OC Mbongo Sport, a football club in the Democratic Republic of Congo

See also
Bongo (disambiguation)